Killswitch Engage (often called Killswitch Engage II or KSE II) is the fifth studio album by American metalcore band Killswitch Engage. It was released on June 30, 2009 through Roadrunner Records. It is the band's second album to be self-titled, the first being their debut album. It was produced by Adam Dutkiewicz and Brendan O'Brien. The album's reception from critics and fans has been  mixed, with praise for Howard Jones's vocals and criticism of Dutkiewicz's and O'Brien's production and the album's reliance on formula.

The album debuted and peaked at number 7 on the Billboard 200, selling 58,000 copies in its first week, making it one of the band's highest charting albums to date.

It was supported by three singles, "Reckoning", "Starting Over", and "Save Me", as well as two music videos. This is the band's last studio album to feature Howard Jones on lead vocals.

Background 
The album was officially announced in late 2008. Recording began in October 2008 with Dutkiewicz and co-producer Brendan O'Brien.

In February 2009, bassist Mike D'Antonio confirmed in an interview with Metal Hammer that "drums were finished", and that he had "finished up the last few bass fixes". He also stated that Howard [Jones] is in Atlanta finishing vocals, and that "it shouldn't be too much longer now." The album's name was announced on April 14, and was revealed to be their second self-titled album since their debut album of the same name.

Before the album's release, "A Light in a Darkened World" was added to the band's setlist in the first half of 2009. The band also performed it at the 2009 Golden Gods Awards. On May 28, 2009, the band's official fanclub, Take This Oath, were granted access to listen to the track "Reckoning". It was released as a promotional single the following day, and was available as a free download on Roadrunner Records' official website.

On June 19, the entire album was available for preview at various Hot Topic locations. It was posted on the band's official Myspace on June 25.

Release and promotion 
The album was released on June 30, 2009 through Roadrunner Records. It debuted at number 7 on the Billboard 200, selling more than 58,000 copies in its first week, making it the band's highest charting album to date. A special edition was released on the same day.

If the album was pre-ordered on the band's official website, the buyer would be entered into a drawing to win a custom Parker P44 guitar with artwork from the album as the paint job.

Throughout July and August 2009, the band participated in the Mayhem Festival with headlining bands Marilyn Manson, Slayer, Bullet For My Valentine and more in promotion of the album.

The album's first official single, "Starting Over", was available for digital download on June 6, 2009. It charted at number 30 on the Billboard Rock Songs Chart. A music video for the track was shot in early 2009 and directed by Lex Halaby. The video was premiered on VH1 on June 5, and on MTV the following the day. On May 24, 2010, a trailer of the music video for the album's third single, "Save Me", was released on the band's website. The video premiered on Craveonline the following day. The entire video was created using claymation, and depicts the band members saving lead vocalist Howard Jones from aliens.

Critical reception 

The review aggregator site Metacritic scored the album a 72 out of 100, based on the reviews of 6 critics, which indicates "generally favorable reviews". While praise has been generated around Howard Jones' vocals and the album's stylistic use of the metalcore and post-hardcore genres, criticism has been directed towards Adam Dutkiewicz's and Brendan O'Brien's production as well as the band's reliance on formula.

James Christopher Monger of AllMusic gave the album a positive review, scoring the album a 3.5 out of 5, commenting that "where 2006's 'As Daylight Dies' hinted at an accelerated focus on the more melodic aspects of extreme metal, Killswitch Engage cements the notion." Monger indicated "Starting Over", "Reckoning", and "A Light in a Darkened World" as his AMG track picks. Alternative Press gave a positive review as well, scoring the album a 4 out of 5, saying "this album isn't going to change the way you think about metal, but Killswitch Engage aren't Mastodon; they just want to get the pit going, and this album will surely accomplish that."

However, Christa Titus of Billboard gave the album a mixed review, scoring it a 50 out of 100. While positively commenting, "As an act that forsakes breakdowns and unintelligible screaming in favor of focused aggression and predictable melodic swells, you can't help but enjoy such quintessential Killswitch Engage tracks as 'Never Again' or the Metallica-esque chords that open 'The Forgotten,' the review concluded, "Aside from a few unique moments ('The Return,' 'Take Me Away'), there's not much new to report here."

Adrien Begrand of PopMatters gave a mixed review as well, scoring the album a 5 out of 10. While praising Howard Jones' vocals, commenting "With its contemplative tone and sense of melodrama, the contagious 'Starting Over' borders on post-hardcore and features some of Jones's strongest vocal melodies to date," and Reckoning' and 'This is Goodbye' feature some very effective melodic death metal touches reminiscent of Swedish stars In Flames and Soilwork, while 'The Return' is a daring foray into teary-eyed power balladry, a terrific showcase for Jones," the review criticized Adam Dutkiewicz's and Brendan O'Brien's overall production, commenting, "Unfortunately, though, the production by Dutkiewicz and mainstream go-to guy Brendan O'Brien strips the guitars of any bite whatsoever, rendering the overall tone surprisingly muddy and often flaccid, something we notice most on tracks like 'Never Again' and 'The Forgotten', which play up the crunchy riffs, but completely lack the power they deserve on record."

Track listing

Special edition DVD
 'Making of' documentary
 Exclusive band interviews

Personnel

Killswitch Engage
 Mike D'Antonio – bass, digital design, artwork photography, layout design
 Adam Dutkiewicz – lead guitar, backing vocals, co-producer, recording assistant, engineering, mixing, guitars and bass recording
 Justin Foley – drums
 Howard Jones – lead vocals
 Joel Stroetzel – rhythm guitar, backing vocals

Production
 Brendan O'Brien – producer
 Tom Tapley, Jim Fogarty, Martin Cooke, Kory Aaron – recording assistants
 Mala Sharma and Jackie O'Brien – production coordinators
 Billy Bowers – assistant engineer
 Ted Jensen – mastering at Sterling Sound, New York, NY
 Nick DiDia – drums and vocals recording

Management
 Vaughn Lewis and Kenny Gabor for Channel Zero Entertainment
 Mike Gitter – A&R
 Mark Scribner – business management at PS Business Management
 Nick Ferrara and Mike McKoy – legal representation at Serling, Rooks & Ferrara, LLP
 Tim Borror – U.S. booking at The Agency Group
 Paul Ryan – international booking at The Agency Group

Artwork
 Travis Shinn – group photography

Charts

References

External links
Killswitch Engage on Roadrunner Records

2009 albums
Killswitch Engage albums
Roadrunner Records albums
Albums produced by Brendan O'Brien (record producer)
Albums produced by Adam Dutkiewicz